Litwa is the Polish name for Lithuania. Other meanings include:

 Litwa (newspaper), Polish-language periodical published in Vilnius in 1908–1914
 Miodusy-Litwa, a village in the administrative district of Gmina Wysokie Mazowieckie, Wysokie Mazowieckie County, Podlaskie Voivodeship, in north-eastern Poland
 Stara Litwa, a village in the administrative district of Gmina Kulesze Kościelne, Wysokie Mazowieckie County, Podlaskie Voivodeship, in north-eastern Poland
 Kostry-Litwa, a village in the administrative district of Gmina Nowe Piekuty, Wysokie Mazowieckie County, Podlaskie Voivodeship, in north-eastern Poland.

See also
Litva (disambiguation)